W. James McCombe was a Scottish footballer who played as a winger.

Career
McCombe began his career in 1931 with local club Bothwellhaugh A. Moves to Wishaw Thistle and Wishaw Juniors followed, before signing Heart of Midlothian in 1934. McCombe failed to break into the first team at Hearts (making one Scottish Cup appearance in 1935) and subsequently signed for Clyde in 1935, for whom he made his Scottish Football League debut. Later that year, McCombe joined King's Park. In 1936, McCombe signed for Clapton Orient. On 29 August 1936, McCombe made his debut for the club, scoring in a 1–1 draw at home to Crystal Palace. McCombe stayed at the club for two seasons, making 50 appearances, scoring eight times. In 1938, McCombe signed for newly formed Chelmsford City. In 1939, McCombe joined Dartford.

Personal life
McCombe went by the name "Jimmy", a shortening of his middle name. His first initials were WJ.

References

Year of birth missing
Year of death missing
Association football wingers
Scottish footballers
People from Bothwell
Footballers from South Lanarkshire
Wishaw Juniors F.C. players
Heart of Midlothian F.C. players
Clyde F.C. players
King's Park F.C. players
Leyton Orient F.C. players
Chelmsford City F.C. players
Dartford F.C. players
Scottish Football League players
English Football League players
Date of birth missing
Date of death missing